Auburn is a town in Worcester County, Massachusetts, United States. The population was 16,889 at the 2020 census.

History 
The Auburn area was first settled in 1714 as of today outer parts of Worcester, Sutton, Leicester and Oxford, Massachusetts, and the town was officially incorporated on April 10, 1778, as the town of Ward, in honor of American Revolution General Artemas Ward. The town changed its name to Auburn in 1837, after the Post Office complained that the name was too similar to the nearby town of Ware.

Before incorporation, most of Auburn was known as the South Parish of Worcester; other portions fell within the town limits of Leicester and Millbury.

Today, Auburn is bordered by Worcester to the north, Leicester to the west,
Millbury to the east, and Oxford to the south.

Robert H. Goddard launched the first liquid-fueled rocket from Pakachoag Hill, on his aunt Effe Ward's farm, in Auburn on March 16, 1926.  Goddard is commemorated in Goddard Memorial Park, located downtown next to the Auburn Fire Department Headquarters. The park features a model of Goddard's prototype liquid-fueled rocket and a Polaris missile (Type A-1). A second replica of Goddard's prototype stands at Auburn High School.

Goddard's launch is also commemorated with a small monument, the Goddard Rocket Launching Site, between the first and ninth holes of Pakachoag Golf Course.

Geography

Government

The form of government is representative town meeting. There are 24 town-meeting members from each of the five precincts of the town, for a total of 120 who represent the people at the annual town meeting each May. The town also has a Board of Selectmen which consists of 5 elected members each serving for a term of 3 years. As of 2009 the town adopted a new charter which allowed for the creation of a Town Manager.

Demographics

The 2010 Auburn, MA, population was 16,188. There are 1,053 people per square mile.

The median age is 40.8. The US median is 37.6. 61.86% of people in Auburn, MA, are married. 8.00% are divorced. The average household size is 2.41 people. 22.71% of people are married, with children. 5.08% have children, but are single.

According to the 2000 census, 97.21% of people are white, 0.81% are black or African American, 1.19% are Asian, 0.10% are Native American, and 1.00% are "other". 1.24% of the people in Auburn, MA, are of Hispanic ethnicity.

Highways
I-90: The 138 mile Massachusetts Turnpike was commissioned in 1957 and is a part of the 3,099 mile long I-90, the longest Interstate in the country. Almost 5 miles of I-90 runs from the west-southwest to east-northeast through Auburn and is six lanes wide (three each direction) through the town. The right of way is nominally about 300 feet wide. Auburn also contains Exit 10. The total land utilized in Auburn for the interstate is about 200 acres.

I-290: The first three miles of the 20 mile long eastbound (heads north in Auburn) Interstate 290 is in Auburn along with exits 7 (I-90), 8 (Rt. 12), and 9 (Swanson Rd EB, Auburn St. WB).

I-395: Two miles of Interstate 395 are in Auburn which becomes I-290 after Exit 6 (US 20).

Route 12: Five miles of Rt. 12 (Southbridge St.) traverses generally north/south through Auburn and its intersection with Auburn St. is named Drury Square.

US 20: Five miles of US 20 runs through Auburn. At 3,365 miles, US 20 is the longest road in the United States. In Auburn it is also known as Southbridge St. (concurrent section with RT 12), Washington St. and the SW Cutoff.

Education

Auburn has two elementary schools, Bryn Mawr School (grades K–2) and Pakachoag School (grades K–2). All Auburn public school students attend Swanson Road Intermediate School (grades 3–5) and Auburn Middle School (grades 6–8). Some students attend Auburn High School (grades 9–12), while others are given the option to attend Bay Path Regional Vocational Technical High School in nearby Charlton.

A new Auburn High School opened on Drury Square in the center of town directly next to the old high school in the fall of 2006, equipped with turfed fields, to include (Memorial Field) all-purpose field for soccer, football, track & field, lacrosse, a turf baseball field, and a grass softball field (Rebecca J. Colokaithis Field), as well three new tennis courts and a basketball court (Holstrom Corner). Auburn High School participates in the Massachusetts Comprehensive Assessment System.

In 2006 a group called "Save the '35" protested demolition of the oldest (1935) wing of the former high school. The old high school has now been completely demolished, except the dome on top of the high school, which is now located as a monument outside of right center field of the baseball field. A few of the bricks of the old building were sold within the town, and there are some located at the Auburn Historical Museum. In 1997, the Eastern Nazarene College started a learning annex in Auburn.

Points of interest
 Auburn Mall
 Goddard Rocket Launching Site
 Horgan Skating Rink
 Worcester Flood Diversion Channel

Notable people
Paul Allaire, CEO of Xerox Corp. from 1990 to 2001
Jacob Whitman Bailey, biologist, educator (1811–1857)
Tyler Beede (born 1993), baseball pitcher for the Pittsburgh Pirates 
John Curdo, chess player, US Senior Championship winner
Joslyn Fox, stage name of Patrick Allen Joslyn (born 1986), an American drag performer
Jeffrey Lynn, (born Ragnar Godfrey Lind) American stage-screen actor and film producer (1909–1995)

See also
 Worcester Historical Museum

References

External links

Town of Auburn
Auburn Public Schools
Auburn Historical Museum

 
Populated places established in 1714
1714 establishments in Massachusetts